"Who You Wit" is a 1997 single by rapper Jay-Z that is produced by Ski. It was released in promotion of the 1997 comedy film Sprung and appears on its soundtrack, Sprung (Music from and Inspired by the Motion Picture). Its beat samples "Night Love" by the Jeff Lorber Fusion.

A track named "Who You Wit II" appears on Jay-Z's second album In My Lifetime, Vol. 1. It features the same beat, but adds an additional verse that the original version lacked.

Formats and track listings

CD
 "Who You Wit (Clean Version)" (4:05)
 "Who You Wit (Album Version)" (4:07)
 "Who You Wit (Instrumental Version)" (4:07)
 "Who You Wit (A Cappella Clean Version)" (3:58)

Vinyl

A-Side
 "Who You Wit (Album Version)" (4:07)
 "Who You Wit (A Cappella)" (3:58)

B-Side
 "Who You Wit (Clean Version)" (4:07)
 "Who You Wit (Instrumental)" (4:08)

Charts

Weekly charts

See also
List of songs recorded by Jay-Z

1997 singles
Jay-Z songs
Songs written by Jay-Z
Roc-A-Fella Records singles
Def Jam Recordings singles
1997 songs